Christopher Coe (1953 – September 6, 1994) was an American novelist.

Coe was born in Fountain Hill, Pennsylvania and raised in Portland, Oregon. As an adult he lived in both New York City and Paris. Educated at Columbia University, he was a classmate of Amy Hempel, David Leavitt and Anderson Ferrell.

His first novel, I Look Divine, published in 1987, his second, Such Times, in 1993. As well as a writer, Coe also worked as a photographer and cabaret singer.

Coe died of AIDS on September 6, 1994, at his home in Manhattan.

References

1953 births
1994 deaths
AIDS-related deaths in New York (state)
Photographers from Oregon
American male novelists
20th-century American novelists
American gay writers
American LGBT novelists
20th-century American male writers
20th-century American LGBT people
Gay novelists